ʿAbdallāh ibn ʿAbd al-Malik ibn Marwān (in Greek sources , Abdelas) was an Umayyad prince, the son of Caliph Abd al-Malik ibn Marwan, a general and the governor of Egypt in 705–709.

Life 
He was a son of Caliph Abd al-Malik and one of the Caliph's  (concubines). During his youth he accompanied his father on several campaigns. He is first mentioned in the sources as leading his own campaign in 700/1, as a retaliation for the attacks of the Byzantine general Heraclius. During this expedition he captured the border fortress of Theodosiopolis and raided into Armenia Minor. In 701 he was sent, along with his uncle, Muhammad ibn Marwan, to Iraq, to aid al-Hajjaj ibn Yusuf in subduing the rebellion of Abd al-Rahman ibn Muhammad ibn al-Ash'ath. In the next year, the Byzantine Armenian provinces east of the Euphrates, recently conquered by Muhammad ibn Marwan, rose in a revolt that spread out over much of Armenia. In 703, Abdallah conquered Mopsuestia (al-Massisa) in Cilicia, which he refortified as the Caliphate's first major stronghold in the area, and then proceeded to subdue the Armenian revolt along with his uncle Muhammad. His father also appointed him as governor of Jund Hims, according to Khalifah ibn Khayyat, although al-Baladhuri claims that this was done by al-Walid I.

In late 704 he was recalled from Armenia to serve as governor of Egypt, succeeding his long-serving uncle Abd al-Aziz ibn Marwan. Abdallah's tenure was marked by his efforts to assert the caliphal government's control over the province after Abd al-Aziz's twenty-year tenure, which had made the province virtually his personal fief. This was done at the expense of the local elites, whom Abd al-Aziz had been careful to co-opt. Abdallah dismissed his uncle's appointees and required that government business be done in Arabic instead of Coptic. His tenure was marred by the first famine under Islamic rule and by accusations of corruption and embezzlement of public funds. He was recalled in 708/9 and his gains were confiscated by the Caliph. During his tenure, he also came into conflict with many local military leaders, especially the governor of Ifriqiya, Musa ibn Nusayr.

Nothing is known of him thereafter, except for a report by al-Ya'qubi that he was executed by crucifixion by the first Abbasid caliph, al-Saffah, at al-Hira in 749/50.

References

Sources 
 
 
 
 
 
 .
 .

670s births
750 deaths
Umayyad people of the Arab–Byzantine wars
Generals of the Umayyad Caliphate
Umayyad governors of Egypt
Umayyad governors of Hims
8th-century Umayyad governors of Egypt
People executed by crucifixion
People from Damascus
Arab generals
8th-century executions by the Abbasid Caliphate
7th-century Arabs
8th-century Arabs